Euclavarctus is a genus of tardigrades, in the subfamily Euclavarctinae which is part of the family Halechiniscidae. The genus was named and described by Jeanne Renaud-Mornant in 1975.

Species
The genus includes two species:
 Euclavarctus convergens Renaud-Mornant, 1983
 Euclavarctus thieli Renaud-Mornant, 1975

References

Publications
Renaud-Mornant (1975), Deep-sea Tardigrada from the Meteor Indian Ocean expedition. Meteor Forschungsergebnisse. Reihe D: Biologie, vol. 21, p. 54-61.

Tardigrade genera
Halechiniscidae